November 7 - Eastern Orthodox liturgical calendar - November 9

All fixed commemorations below celebrated on November 21 by Orthodox Churches on the Old Calendar.

For November 8th, Orthodox Churches on the Old Calendar commemorate the Saints listed on October 26.

Saints
 Synaxis of the Holy Archangels Michael, Gabriel, Raphael, Uriel, Salaphiel, Jegudiel, Barachiel, Jeremiel and the Other Bodiless Powers.

Pre-Schism Western saints
 The Four Crowned Martyrs (c. 305):
 Secundus, Severian, Carpophorus and Victorinus;
 Claudius, Nicostratus, Symphorian, Castorius and Simplicius. 
 Saint Maurus, second Bishop of Verdun, Confessor (383)
 Saint Clarus of Marmoutier, a monk at the monastery of Marmoutier with St Martin; he was ordained priest and then lived as a hermit near the monastery (389)
 Saint Cybi (Cuby), Cornish bishop and, briefly king, who worked largely in North Wales (6th century)
 Saint Deusdedit (Adeodatus I), Pope of Rome (618)
 Saint Tysilio (Tyssel, Tyssilo, Suliau), Prince of Powys, Abbot of Meifod, Wales (7th century)
 Saint Willehad, Bishop of Bremen, Confessor (789)
 Saint Wiomad (Weomadus, Wermad), a monk at St Maximinus in Trier in Germany, he became Abbot of Mettlach and finally Bishop of Trier (790)
 Saint Moroc, Abbot of Dunkeld and afterwards Bishop of Dunblane in Scotland (9th century)
 Saint Gregory of Einsiedeln, Abbot of Einsiedeln Abbey (c. 945 or 996)
 Saint Gervadius (Gernard, Garnet), born in Ireland, he went to Moray and became a hermit near Elgin in Scotland (10th century)

Post-Schism Orthodox saints
 Righteous Maria (Martha in monasticism), Princess of Pskov  (1300)

New martyrs and confessors
 New Martyr Michael the Blessed, of Chernigov (1922)
 New Hieromartyr Paul Ansimov, Priest (1937)  (see also: November 9 )
 New Hieromartyr Alexis (Zadvornov), Hieromonk of Yaroslavl-Rostov (1937)  (see also: November 9 )

Icons
 * Synaxis of the Archangel Michael "Mantamados" ("Taxiarches Michael"), on Lesbos. 
 * Synaxis of the Archangel Michael "Panormitis", on Symi.

Other commemorations
 Repose of Nun Barbara of Birsk (1903)
 Repose of Elder Photius of Valaam Monastery (1942)
 Repose of Blessed Olga Micahel of Alaska, Matushka (1979)
 Repose of Metropolitan Philaret (Voznesensky) of New York (1985)
 Repose of Elder Iakovos (Tsalikis), of the Holy Monastery of Venerable David, in Euboea (1991).
 Repose of Priest George Calciu of Romania and Alexandria, Virginia (2006).

Icon gallery

Notes

References

Sources
 November 8/November 21. Orthodox Calendar (PRAVOSLAVIE.RU).
 November 21 / November 8. HOLY TRINITY RUSSIAN ORTHODOX CHURCH (A parish of the Patriarchate of Moscow).
 November 8. OCA - The Lives of the Saints.
 The Autonomous Orthodox Metropolia of Western Europe and the Americas (ROCOR). St. Hilarion Calendar of Saints for the year of our Lord 2004. St. Hilarion Press (Austin, TX). pp. 83–84.
 The Eighth Day of the Month of November. Orthodoxy in China.
 November 8. Latin Saints of the Orthodox Patriarchate of Rome.
 The Roman Martyrology. Transl. by the Archbishop of Baltimore. Last Edition, According to the Copy Printed at Rome in 1914. Revised Edition, with the Imprimatur of His Eminence Cardinal Gibbons. Baltimore: John Murphy Company, 1916. pp. 344–345.
 Rev. Richard Stanton. A Menology of England and Wales, or, Brief Memorials of the Ancient British and English Saints Arranged According to the Calendar, Together with the Martyrs of the 16th and 17th Centuries. London: Burns & Oates, 1892. pp. 531–532.
Greek Sources
 Great Synaxaristes:  8 ΝΟΕΜΒΡΙΟΥ. ΜΕΓΑΣ ΣΥΝΑΞΑΡΙΣΤΗΣ.
  Συναξαριστής. 8 Νοεμβρίου. ECCLESIA.GR. (H ΕΚΚΛΗΣΙΑ ΤΗΣ ΕΛΛΑΔΟΣ).
  08/11/2016. Ορθόδοξος Συναξαριστής. 
Russian Sources
  21 ноября (8 ноября). Православная Энциклопедия под редакцией Патриарха Московского и всея Руси Кирилла (электронная версия). (Orthodox Encyclopedia - Pravenc.ru).
  8 ноября по старому стилю  /  21 ноября по новому стилю. Русская Православная Церковь - Православный церковный календарь на 2016 год.

November in the Eastern Orthodox calendar